NLBeter ( or 'Netherlands Recovered') is a political party in the Netherlands. Founded in November 2019, it primarily advocated for healthcare reform.

History 
NLBeter was founded in November 2019 by a number of healthcare professionals, who sought to improve the Dutch healthcare system. The party announced its intention to participate in the upcoming general election, which took place on 17 March 2021. Psychiatrist Esther van Fenema was chosen as the party's lijsttrekker.

References

External links
 

Political parties in the Netherlands
Political parties established in 2019
2019 establishments in the Netherlands